Ernesto Damiani is a professor of computer science at the University of Milan, where he leads the Architectures Research (SESAR) Lab. He is the Senior Director of the Artificial Intelligence and Intelligent Systems Institute at Khalifa University, in the UAE. He holds visiting positions at Tokyo Denki University, Université de Bourgogne. Damiani received an honorary doctorate from Institut National des Sciences Appliquées de Lyon, France (2017). His research spans security, Big Data and knowledge processing, where he has published over 400 peer-reviewed articles and books. He is a Senior Member of the IEEE and a Distinguished Scientist of ACM. Since 2018, he is the President of the Italian Inter-University Consortium for Informatics.

References

External links
 Homepage at University of Milan
 ACM author page

Computer scientists
Academic staff of the University of Milan
Living people
Year of birth missing (living people)